Cyme triangularis is a moth of the subfamily Arctiinae. It is found in New Guinea.

References

Nudariina
Moths of New Guinea